In enzymology, a phosphonoacetate hydrolase is an enzyme that catalyzes the chemical reaction

phosphonoacetate + H2O  acetate + phosphate

Thus, the two substrates of this enzyme are phosphonoacetate and H2O, whereas its two products are acetate and phosphate.

This enzyme belongs to the family of hydrolases, specifically those acting on carbon-phosphorus bonds.  The systematic name of this enzyme class is phosphonoacetate phosphonohydrolase. This enzyme participates in aminophosphonate metabolism.  It employs one cofactor, zinc.

Structural studies

The structure of this enzyme, with the PDB accession code , shows it adopts the alkaline phosphatase fold.

References

External links

EC 3.11.1
Zinc enzymes
Enzymes of known structure